This article is about the particular significance of the year 1892 to Wales and its people.

Incumbents

Archdruid of the National Eisteddfod of Wales – Clwydfardd

Lord Lieutenant of Anglesey – Richard Davies 
Lord Lieutenant of Brecknockshire – Joseph Bailey, 1st Baron Glanusk
Lord Lieutenant of Caernarvonshire – John Ernest Greaves
Lord Lieutenant of Cardiganshire – Herbert Davies-Evans
Lord Lieutenant of Carmarthenshire – John Campbell, 2nd Earl Cawdor
Lord Lieutenant of Denbighshire – William Cornwallis-West    
Lord Lieutenant of Flintshire – Hugh Robert Hughes 
Lord Lieutenant of Glamorgan – Robert Windsor-Clive, 1st Earl of Plymouth
Lord Lieutenant of Merionethshire – W. R. M. Wynne 
Lord Lieutenant of Monmouthshire – Henry Somerset, 8th Duke of Beaufort
Lord Lieutenant of Montgomeryshire – Sir Herbert Williams-Wynn, 7th Baronet 
Lord Lieutenant of Pembrokeshire – William Edwardes, 4th Baron Kensington
Lord Lieutenant of Radnorshire – Arthur Walsh, 2nd Baron Ormathwaite

Bishop of Bangor – Daniel Lewis Lloyd   
Bishop of Llandaff – Richard Lewis
Bishop of St Asaph – Alfred George Edwards
Bishop of St Davids – Basil Jones

Events
January – The children's magazine Cymru'r Plant is launched by Owen Morgan Edwards.
5 March – St Michael's & All Angels (Anglican) Theological College is founded at Aberdare.
30 May – The South Wales Argus, published in Newport, is launched.
14 July – Official inauguration of the Liverpool water supply from Lake Vyrnwy. The Vyrnwy dam is the first high masonry gravity dam in Britain.
13 September – The Watkin Path up Snowdon is officially opened by William Ewart Gladstone.
14 September – The Cardiff water supply from Cantref Reservoir is officially inaugurated by the Mayor of Merthyr Tydfil.
date unknown
J.D. Lewis establishes the Gomer Press at Llandysul.
The Parc and Dare Hall in Treorchy opens as a workingmen's institute and library.

Arts and literature

Awards
National Eisteddfod of Wales – held at Rhyl
Chair – Evan Jones, "Y Cenhadwr"
Crown – John John Roberts, "Dewi Sant"

New books
D Davies – Patagonia: a description of the country
Daniel James (Gwyrosydd) – Caniadau Gwyrosydd
Thomas Gwynn Jones – Eglwys y Dyn Tlawd
John Richard Williams (J.R. Tryfanwy) – Lloffion yr Amddifad

Music
Joseph Parry – Saul of Tarsus (oratorio)
David Christmas Williams – Traeth Llafar (cantata)

Sport
Baseball – The Welsh Baseball Union is founded.
Football – The Welsh Cup is won by Chirk for the fourth time in its 13-year history.
Golf – The course at Aberdovey is opened.

Births
23 March – Jack Whitfield, Wales rugby union captain (died 1927)
15 May – Jimmy Wilde, professional boxer (died 1969)
12 June – Hilda Vaughan, novelist (died 1985)
20 June – Geoffrey Crawshay, soldier and social benefactor (died 1954)
25 July – Brigadier Hugh Llewellyn Glyn Hughes, soldier and medical administrator (died 1973)
12 August – Jerry Shea, Welsh rugby union and rugby league player (died 1947)
18 September – Joe Johns, Welsh lightweight boxing champion (died 1927)
12 November – Tudor Davies, operatic tenor (died 1958)
19 November – Huw T. Edwards, trade union leader and politician (died 1970)

Deaths
13 February – William Davies, palaeontologist, 76
5 March – Theophilus Redwood, pharmacist, 85
15 March – Mesac Thomas, Anglican bishop in Australia, 75
22 April – William Williams, Presbyterian missionary in India, 33 (typhoid)
24 April – John Davies (Ossian Gwent), poet, 53
27 April – Edward Wingfield Humphreys, Welsh-born New Zealand politician, 50/51 
6 May – Robert J. Davies, Calvinistic Methodist leader, 52
5 June – Robert Rees, singer and musician, 51
19 June – Lewis Llewelyn Dillwyn, industrialist and politician, 78
3 October – William Davies (Gwilym Teilo), poet and historian, 61
26 November – Edward Matthews, minister and author, 79
18 December – Richard Owen, anatomist, 88
23 December – John Gibson, architect of the Marble Church, Bodelwyddan, 75
27 December – Samuel Holland, politician, 89

References

Wales